Mollu may refer to:
Aşağı Mollu, Azerbaijan
Yuxarı Mollu, Azerbaijan